The Medical community as used in this article refers to medical institutions and services offered to populations under the jurisdiction of the late Roman Republic and the Roman Empire. The Medical services of the Roman Republic and the early Roman Empire were adopted from ancient Greece. It was first imported from Greece through Greek colonies in Magna Graecia and the Etruscan civilization. After the Roman conquest of Greece, enslaved Greeks brought more Greek medical knowledge to Rome. In 219 BCE a surgeon named Archagathus traveled from the Peloponnesus to Rome. He became a citizen and purchased a taberna near a crossroads. This became the first officina medica. Previously, the pater familias was responsible for the medical art in early Rome. Physicians in ancient Rome would take the Hippocratic Oath. Doctors would begin their appointments with patients by stating "si vales valeo," which translated to "if you are well I am well." Physicians were often wealthy. Augustus' physician, Antonius Musa, received a salary of 30,000 sesterces. Doctors would also serve in the Roman military and treat injured soldiers.

Background
Medical services of the late Roman Republic and early Roman Empire were mainly imports from the civilization of Ancient Greece, at first through Greek-influenced Etruscan society and Greek colonies placed directly in Italy, and then through Greeks enslaved during the Roman conquest of Greece, Greeks invited to Rome, or Greek knowledge imparted to Roman citizens visiting or being educated in Greece. A perusal of the names of Roman physicians will show that the majority are wholly or partly Greek and that many of the physicians were of servile origin.

The servility stigma came from the accident of a more medically advanced society being conquered by a lesser. One of the cultural ironies of these circumstances is that free men sometimes found themselves in service to the enslaved professional or dignitary, or the power of the state was entrusted to foreigners who had been conquered in battle and were technically slaves. In Greek society, physicians tended to be regarded as noble. Asclepius in Homer's Iliad is noble.

Importation from Greece

Public medicine

A signal event in the Roman medical community was the construction of the first Aesculapium (a temple to the god of healing) in the city of Rome, on Tiber Island. In 293 BC, some officials consulted the Sibylline Books concerning measures to be taken against the plague and were advised to bring Aesculapius from Epidaurus to Rome. The sacred serpent from Epidaurus was conferred ritually on the new temple, or, in some accounts, the serpent escaped from the ship and swam to the island. Baths have been found there as well as votive offerings (donaria) in the shape of specific organs. In classical times the center covered the entire island and included a long-term recovery center. The emperor Claudius had a law passed granting freedom to slaves who had been sent to the institution for cure but were abandoned there. This law probably facilitated state disposition of the patients and recovery of the beds they occupied. The details are not available.

It was not the first time a temple had been constructed at Rome to ward off plague. The consul, Gaius Julius Mento, one of two for the year 431 BC, dedicated a temple to Apollo Medicus ("the healer"). There was also a temple to salus ("health") on the Mons Salutaris, a spur of the Quirinal. There is no record that these earlier temples possessed the medical facilities associated with an Aesculapium; in that case, the later decision to bring them in presupposes a new understanding that scientific measures could be taken against plague. The memorable description of plague at Athens during the Peloponnesian War (430 BC) by Thucydides does not mention any measures at all to relieve those stricken with it. The dying were allowed to accumulate at the wells, which they contaminated, and the deceased to pile up there. At Rome, Cicero criticized the worship of evil powers, such as Febris ("Fever"), Dea Mefitis ("Malaria"), Dea Angerona ("Sore Throat") and Dea Scabies ("Rash").

The medical art in early Rome was the responsibility of the pater familias, or patriarch. The last known public advocate of this point of view were the railings of Marcus Cato against Greek physicians and his insistence on passing on home remedies to his son. 
The importation of the Aesculapium established medicine in the public domain. There is no record of fees being collected for a stay at one of them, at Rome or elsewhere. The expense of an Aesculapium must have been defrayed in the same way as all temple expenses: individuals vowed to perform certain actions or contribute a certain amount if certain events happened, some of which were healings. Such a system amounts to gradated contributions by income, as the contributor could only vow what he could provide. The building of a temple and its facilities on the other hand was the responsibility of the magistrates. The funds came from the state treasury or from taxes.

Private medicine
A second signal act marked the start of sponsorship of private medicine by the state as well. In the year 219 BC, a vulnerarius, or surgeon, Archagathus, visited Rome from the Peloponnesus and was asked to stay. The state conferred citizenship on him and purchased him a taberna, or shop, near the compitium Acilii (a crossroads), which became the first officina medica.

The doctor necessarily had many assistants. Some prepared and vended medicines and tended the herb garden. There were pharmacopolae (note the female ending), unguentarii and aromatarii, all of which names are easily understood by the English reader. Others attended the doctor when required (the capsarii; they prepared and carried the doctor's capsa, or bag.). Jerome Carcopino's study of occupational names in the Corpus Inscriptionum Latinarum turned up 51 medici, 4 medicae (female doctors), an obstetrix ("midwife") and a nutrix ("nurse") in the city of Rome. These numbers, of course, are at best proportional to the true populations, which were many times greater.

At the bottom of the scale were the ubiquitous discentes ("those learning") or medical apprentices. Roman doctors of any stature combed the population for persons in any social setting who had an interest in and ability for practicing medicine. On the one hand the doctor used their services unremittingly. On the other they were treated like members of the family; i.e., they came to stay with the doctor and when they left they were themselves doctors. The best doctors were the former apprentices of the Aesculapia, who, in effect, served residencies there.

The practice of medicine

Medical values

The Romans valued a state of valetudo, salus or sanitas. They began their correspondence with the salutation si vales valeo, "if you are well, I am" and ended it with salve, "be healthy".  The Indo-European roots are *wal-, "be strong", a wholeness were to some degree perpetuated by right living. The Hippocratic Oath obliges doctors to live rightly (setting an example). The first cause thought of when people got sick was that they did not live rightly. Vegetius' brief section on the health of a Roman legion states only that a legion can avoid disease by staying out of malarial swamps, working out regularly and living a healthy life.

Despite their best efforts people from time to time did become aeger, "sick". They languished, had nausea (words of Roman extraction) or "fell" (incidere) in morbum.  They were vexed and dolorous. At that point they were in need of the medica res, the men skilled in the ars medicus, who would curare  morbum, "have a care for the disease", who went by the name of medicus or medens. The root is *med-, "measure". The medicus prescribed medicina or regimina as measures against the disease.

The physician
The next step was to secure the cura of a medicus. If the patient was too sick to move one sent for a clinicus, who went to the clinum or couch of the patient. Of higher status were the chirurgii (which became the English word surgeon), from Greek cheir (hand) and ourgon (work). In addition were the eye doctor, ocularius, the ear doctor, auricularius, and the doctor of snakebites, the marsus.

That the poor paid a minimal fee for the visit of a medicus is indicated by a wisecrack in Plautus: "It was less than a nummus." Many anecdotes exist of doctors negotiating fees with wealthy patients and refusing to prescribe a remedy if agreement was not reached. Pliny says:
I will not accuse the medical art of the avarice even of its professors, the rapacious bargains made with their patients while their fate is trembling in the balance, …

The fees charged were on a sliding scale according to assets. The physicians of the rich were themselves rich. For example, Antonius Musa treated Augustus' nervous symptoms with cold baths and drugs. He was not only set free but he became Augustus' physician. He received a salary of 300,000 sesterces. There is no evidence that he was other than a private physician; that is, he was not working for the Roman government.

Legal responsibility
Doctors were generally exempt from prosecution for their mistakes. Some writers complain of legal murder. However, holding the powerful up to exorbitant fees ran the risk of retaliation. Pliny reports that the emperor Claudius fined a physician,  Alcon, 180 million sesterces and exiled him to Gaul, but that on his return he made the money back in just a few years. Pliny does not say why the physician was exiled,  but the blow against the man was struck on his pocketbook. He could make no such income in Gaul.

This immunity applied only to mistakes made in the treatment of free men. By chance a law existed at Rome, the Lex Aquilia, passed about 286 BC, which allowed the owners of slaves and animals to seek remedies for damage to their property, either malicious or negligent. Litigants used this law to proceed against the negligence of medici, such as the performance of an operation on a slave by an untrained surgeon resulting in death or other damage.

Social position
While encouraging and supporting the public and private practice of medicine, the Roman government tended to suppress organizations of medici in society. The constitution provided for the formation of occupational collegia, or guilds. The consuls and the emperors treated these ambivalently. Sometimes they were permitted; more often they were made illegal and were suppressed. The medici formed collegia, which had their own centers, the Scholae Medicorum, but they never amounted to a significant social force. They were regarded as subversive along with all the other collegia.

Doctors were nevertheless influential. They liked to write. Compared to the number of books written, not many have survived; for example, Tiberius Claudius Menecrates composed 150 medical works, of which only a few fragments remain. Some that did remain almost in entirety are the works of Galen, Celsus, Hippocrates and the herbal expert, Pedanius Dioscorides who wrote the 5-volume De materia medica. The Natural History of Pliny the Elder became a paradigm for all subsequent works like it and gave its name to the topic, although Pliny was not himself an observer of the natural world like Aristotle or Theophrastus, whose Enquiry into Plants included a book on their medicinal uses.

Military medical corps

Republican
The state of the military medical corps before Augustus is unclear. Corpsmen certainly existed at least for the administration of first aid and were enlisted soldiers rather than civilians. The commander of the legion was held responsible for removing the wounded from the field and insuring that they got sufficient care and time to recover. He could quarter troops in private domiciles if he thought necessary. Authors who have written of Roman military activities before Augustus, such as Livy, mention that wounded troops retired to population centers to recover.

Imperial
The army of the early empire was sharply and qualitatively different. Augustus defined a permanent professional army by setting the enlistment at 16 years (with an additional 4 for reserve obligations), and establishing a special military fund, the aerarium militare, imposing a 5% inheritance tax and 1% auction sales tax to pay for it. From it came bonus payments to retiring soldiers amounting to several years' salary. It could also have been used to guarantee regular pay. Previously legions had to rely on booty.

If military careers were now possible, so were careers for military specialists, such as medici. Under Augustus for the first time occupational names of officers and functions began to appear in inscriptions. The valetudinaria, or military versions of the aesculapia (the names mean the same thing) became features of permanent camps. Caches of surgical instruments have been found in some of them. From this indirect evidence it is possible to conclude to the formation of an otherwise unknown permanent medical corps.

In the early empire one finds milites medici who were immunes ("exempt") from other duties. Some were staff of the hospital, which Pseudo-Hyginus mentions in De Munitionibus Castrorum  as being set apart from other buildings so that the patients can rest. The hospital administrator was an optio valetudinarii. The orderlies aren't generally mentioned, but they must have existed, as the patients needed care and the doctors had more important duties. Perhaps they were servile or civilians, not worth mentioning. There were some noscomi, male nurses not in the army. Or, they could have been the milites medici. The latter term might be any military medic or it might be orderlies detailed from the legion. There were also medici castrorum. Not enough information survives in the sources to say for certain what distinctions existed, if any.

The army of Augustus featured a standardized officer corps, described by Vegetius. Among them were the ordinarii, the officers of an ordo or rank. In an acies triplex there were three such ordines, the centuries (companies) of which were commanded by centurions. The ordinarii were therefore of the rank of a centurion but did not necessarily command one if they were staff.

The term medici ordinarii in the inscriptions must refer to the lowest ranking military physicians. During his reign, Augustus finally conferred the dignitas equestris, or social rank of knight, on all physicians, public or private. They were then full citizens (in case there were any Hellenic questions) and could wear the rings of knights. In the army there was at least one other rank of physician, the medicus duplicarius, "medic at double pay", and, as the legion had milites sesquiplicarii, "soldiers at 1.5 pay", perhaps the medics had that pay grade as well.

Augustan posts were named according to a formula containing the name of the rank and the unit commanded in the genitive case; e.g., the commander of a legion, who was a legate; that is, an officer appointed by the emperor, was the legatus legionis, "the legate of the legion." Those posts worked pretty much as today; a man on his way up the cursus honorum ("ladder of offices", roughly) would command a legion for a certain term and then move on.

The posts of medicus legionis and a medicus cohortis were most likely to be commanders of the medici of the legion and its cohorts. They were all under the praetor or camp commander, who might be the legatus but more often was under the legatus himself. There was, then, a medical corps associated with each camp. The cavalry alae ("wings") and the larger ships all had their medical officers, the medici alarum and the medici triremis respectively.

Practice

As far as can be determined, the medical corps in battle worked as follows. Trajan's Column depicts medics on the battlefield bandaging soldiers. They were located just behind the standards; i.e., near the field headquarters. This must have been a field aid station, not necessarily the first, as the soldiers or corpsmen among the soldiers would have administered first aid before carrying their wounded comrades to the station. Some soldiers were designated to ride along the line on a horse picking up the wounded. They were paid by the number of men they rescued. Bandaging was performed by capsarii, who carried bandages (fascia) in their capsae, or bags.

From the aid station the wounded went by horse-drawn ambulance to other locations, ultimately to the camp hospitals in the area. There they were seen by the medici vulnerarii, or surgeons, the main type of military doctor. They were given a bed in the hospital if they needed it and one was available. The larger hospitals could administer 400–500 beds. If these were insufficient the camp commander probably utilized civilian facilities in the region or quartered them in the vici, "villages".

A base hospital was quadrangular with barracks-like wards surrounding a central courtyard. On the outside of the quadrangle were private rooms for the patients. Although unacquainted with bacteria, Roman medical doctors knew about contagion and did their best to prevent it. Rooms were isolated, running water carried the waste away, and the drinking and washing water was tapped up the slope from the latrines.

Within the hospital were operating rooms, kitchens, baths, a dispensary, latrines, a mortuary and herb gardens, as doctors relied heavily on herbs for drugs. The medici could treat any wound received in battle, as long as the patient was alive. They operated or otherwise treated with scalpels, hooks, levers, drills, probes, forceps, catheters and arrow-extractors on patients anesthetized with morphine (opium poppy extract) and scopolamine (henbane extract). Instruments were boiled before use. Wounds were washed in vinegar and stitched. Broken bones were placed in traction. There is, however, evidence of wider concerns. A vaginal speculum suggests gynecology was practiced, and an anal speculum implies knowledge that the size and condition of internal organs accessible through the orifices was an indication of health. They could extract eye cataracts with a special needle. Operating room amphitheaters indicate that medical education was ongoing. Many have proposed that the knowledge and practices of the medici were not exceeded until the 20th century.

Regulation of medicine
By the late empire the state had taken more of a hand in regulating medicine. The law codes of the 4th century, such as the Codex Theodosianus, paint a picture of a medical system enforced by the laws and the state apparatus. At the top was the equivalent of a surgeon general of the empire. He was by law a noble, a dux (duke) or a vicarius (vicar) of the emperor. He held the title of comes archiatorum, "count of the chief healers."  The Greek word iatros, "healer", was higher-status than the Latin medicus.

Under the comes were a number of officials called the archiatri, or more popularly the protomedici, supra medicos, domini medicorum or superpositi medicorum. They were paid by the state. It was their function to supervise all the medici in their districts; i.e., they were the chief  medical examiners. Their families were exempt from taxes. They could not be prosecuted nor could troops be quartered in their homes.

The archiatri were divided into two groups:
 archiatri sancti palatii, who were palace physicians
 archiatri populares. They were required to provide for the poor; presumably, the more prosperous still provided for themselves.

The archiatri  settled all medical disputes. Rome had 14 of them; the number in other communities varied from 5 to 10 depending on the population.

See also
 Combat medic
 History of medicine
 Medicine in ancient Greece
 Medicine in ancient Rome

References

Sources

 Carcopino, Jerome. Daily Life in Ancient Rome: The People and the City at the Height of the Empire, Routledge, 1943.

External links
 Aesculapius Scholarly article in Smith's Dictionary of  Greek and Roman Biography and Mythology
 The Etymology of Medicine, Thelma Charin. Bulletin of the Medical Library Association, 1951 July; 39(3): 216–221.
 Surgical Instruments from Ancient Rome, University of Virginia Health System Website.
 Hippocrates, Ann Hanson, Medicina Antiqua website.
  Republished on Bill Thayer's LacusCurtius site.
  Republished on Bill Thayer's LacusCurtius site.
  A collection of online articles (some reprints) on ancient medicine.
  Antique medicine website

Ancient Roman medicine
Ancient Roman physicians